Lydia Yakolevna Lipkowska (Russian: Лидия Яковлевна Липковская. Ukrainian: Лідія Яківна Липковська; 10 May 1882 – 22 March 1958) was a Russian-Romanian operatic soprano of Ukrainian origin.

Biography

Lydia was born in Babyn, where is a village museum dedicated to her, in the family of a rural teacher. Lydia had three sisters, four brothers. Her aunt was Maria Zankovetska, a famous Ukrainian actress. She received education in the Mariinsky Women's Gymnasium in Kamyanets-Podilskyi. Together with other students, she sang in the church choir, she had her own solo parties, drawing attention with a magic voice that ran under the dome of the cathedral. Residents of Kamyanets called the girl "Singing Bird". After Kamyanets-Podiskyi Lipkowska was trained at the Saint Petersburg Conservatory. She is said to have studied with Natalia Iretskaya, a pupil of the well-known Pauline Viardot. She was committed to the Mariinsky Theatre from 1906 to 1908 and again from 1911 to 1913. She was a member of the Metropolitan Opera in New York City from 1909  until 1911. Lipkowska's debut with the Metropolitan was as Violetta in La Traviata on November 18, 1909, with Caruso as Alfredo. She sang as a guest artist at the Boston Opera Company in 1909 and the Chicago Grand Opera Company in 1910. While in Boston, Lipkowska was honored by The Lenox Hotel, which put on its menu the "cup Lydia" and the "Souffle a la Lipkowska".  She petitioned a judge for an injunction against the hotel, claiming that the menu items were "injuring her reputation and holding her up to ridicule." In 1911 she made her debut at the Royal Opera House in London as Mimì in Giacomo Puccini's La bohème.

In 1912, Lipkowska charged New York gangster Sam Schepps with usury over his refusal to return two diamonds worth $80,000 that she'd pawned to him.  Lipkowska said that she'd borrowed $12,000 from Schepps, had left the diamonds with him as security, and that he sought $5000 in interest before he would return the jewels. In 1914 she sang in the world premiere of Amilcare Ponchielli's I Mori di Valenza at the Opéra de Monte-Carlo.

Lipkowska escaped from the Soviet Union with her then husband Pierre Bodin in 1920, arriving in New York on the Adriatic of the White Star Line on February 8. In September 1920, Lipkowska sang Gilda in Rigoletto with the San Carlo Opera Company in Manhattan.  After retiring from the stage she lived in Romania where she was active as a voice teacher. One of her students was the soprano Virginia Zeani. She died in Beirut at the age of 75. For part of her life she was married to baritone Georges Baklanoff.

References

External links

1882 births
1958 deaths
Russian operatic sopranos
Ukrainian operatic sopranos
Voice teachers
Russian Christians
White Russian emigrants to the United States
Saint Petersburg Conservatory alumni
Women music educators
20th-century Russian women opera singers
Soviet emigrants to Romania
Romanian operatic sopranos